Under These Rocks and Stones is the first album by Canadian singer-songwriter Chantal Kreviazuk, released in 1996 (see 1996 in music). Several singles were released in Canada, including "God Made Me", "Believer", "Wayne", "Surrounded" and "Hands". "Surrounded" became the most successful hit of the parent album, eventually receiving airplay even in the US.

Canada and international track listing
"God Made Me" (Kreviazuk, Chris Burke-Gaffney) – 3:10
"Surrounded" (Kreviazuk) – 5:18
"Don't Be Good" (Kreviazuk) – 4:05
"Believer" (Kreviazuk) – 3:16
"Grace" (Kreviazuk) – 5:50
"Wayne" (Kreviazuk) – 4:46
"Imaginary Friend" (Kreviazuk) – 4:11
"Hands" (Burke-Gaffney) – 4:33
"Disagree" (Kreviazuk, Burke-Gaffney) – 3:29
"Co-Dependent" (Burke-Gaffney) – 3:46
"Green Apples" (Kreviazuk) – 4:26
"Boot" (Kreviazuk, Davey Faragher, David Immerglück, Michael Urbano) – 3:50
"Actions Without Love" (Kreviazuk) – 3:52

Japan bonus tracks
"Love Is All" (Kreviazuk, Burke-Gaffney) – 2:55
"Dealer" (Kreviazuk) – 3:39
"Leaving On A Jet Plane" (John Denver) – 4:42 (Included on the 1998 re-release of the album)

US track listing
"God Made Me" (Kreviazuk, Chris Burke-Gaffney) – 3:10
"Surrounded" (Kreviazuk) – 5:18
"Don't Be Good" (Kreviazuk) – 4:05
"Believer" (Kreviazuk) – 3:16
"Grace" (Kreviazuk) – 5:50
"Wayne" (Kreviazuk) – 4:46
"Hands" (Burke-Gaffney) – 4:33
"Disagree" (Kreviazuk, Burke-Gaffney) – 3:29
"Co-Dependent" (Burke-Gaffney) – 3:46
"Green Apples" (Kreviazuk) – 4:26
"Boot" (Kreviazuk, Davey Faragher, David Immerglück, Michael Urbano) – 3:50
"Imaginary Friend" (Kreviazuk) – 4:11

Singles
"God Made Me"
"Believer"
"Wayne"
"Surrounded"
"Hands"

Personnel
Chantal Kreviazuk – vocals, piano, keyboards
Peter Asher – percussion
Chris Burke–Gaffney – guitar
Davey Faragher – vocals, background vocals
Stefanie Fife – cello
David Immerglück – guitar, mandolin, pedal steel
Al Lay – background vocals
Rob Lorentz – violin
Novi Novog – viola
Ed Stasium – Hammond organ
Michael Urbano – percussion, drums

Production
Producers: Peter Asher, Matt Wallace
Engineers: Greg Reely, Matt Wallace
Assistant engineers: Tom Banghart, Michael Baumgertner, Doug Michael
Mixing: Matt Wallace
Mastering: Dave Collins
A&R Direction: Mike Roth
Production coordination: Christina Hiscox, Valerie Pack, Michael Roth
String arrangements: David Rubenstein
Art direction: Sean Evans
Design: Sean Evans
Photography: Naomi Kaltman

Charts
Album – Billboard (North America)

References

Chantal Kreviazuk albums
1996 debut albums
Albums produced by Peter Asher
Albums produced by Matt Wallace
Columbia Records albums